Ravi Narayan Pani is an Indian politician. He was elected to the Lok Sabha, the lower house of the Parliament of India from Deogarh, Odisha as a member of the Janata Dal.

References

External links
Official Biographical Sketch in Lok Sabha Website

1950 births
People from Dhenkanal district
Lok Sabha members from Odisha
India MPs 1989–1991
Janata Dal politicians
Living people